Es kelapa muda (English: young coconut ice or coconut ice) is a beverage made from chilled or iced coconut water, young coconut flesh  and syrup. It is among the most popular beverages in Indonesia. Es kelapa muda is included in the world's 50 most delicious drinks according to CNN on December 9, 2011, ranking 19th.

Liquid sugar, syrup or honey might be used as sweetening agent. The syrup used in this drink is typically cocopandan or vanilla flavored. Some use glass as the container, while traditional es kelapa muda is prepared and drank directly from the whole coconut fruit. Some variants might be spiced up with addition of cinnamon and clove.

In Semarang, the es kelapa muda commonly mixed with slices of jackfruit and tape.

Gallery

See also 

 Es buah
 Es campur
 Es teler
 List of Indonesian beverages

References 

Indonesian drinks
Fruit drinks
Foods containing coconut